Benjamin II may refer to:

 Pope Benjamin II of Alexandria, ruled in 1327–1339
 J. J. Benjamin (1818–1864), who used the pen name "Benjamin II"